The Roman Catholic Diocese of Meru is a diocese located in the city of Meru in the Ecclesiastical province of Nyeri in Kenya.

History
 March 10, 1926: Established as Apostolic Prefecture of Meru from the Apostolic Vicariate of Kenya
 May 7, 1953: Promoted as Diocese of Meru

Bishops
 Prefects Apostolic of Meru (Roman rite)
 Fr. Giovanni Balbo, I.M.C. (1926 – 1929)
 Fr. Carlo Re, I.M.C. (1930 – 16 Sep 1936), concurrently appointed titular bishop and Vicar Apostolic of Nyeri in 1931
 Fr. José Nepote-Fus, I.M.C. (16 Sep 1936  – 7 Aug 1948), appointed Apostolic Administrator of Rio Branco, Brazil in 1948; future Bishop
 Fr. Carlo Maria Cavallera, I.M.C. (Apostolic Administrator 1947 – 3 Mar 1954), concurrently appointed Bishop of Nyeri in 1953
 Bishops of Meru (Roman rite)
 Bishop Lawrence Bessone, I.M.C. (3 Mar 1954  – 7 Apr 1976)
 Bishop Silas Silvius Njiru (9 Dec 1976  – 18 Mar 2004)
 Bishop Salesius Mugambi (since 18 Mar 2004)

Coadjutor Bishop
Salesius Mugambi (2001-2004)

Auxiliary Bishop
Silas Silvius Njiru (1975-1976), appointed Bishop here

See also
Roman Catholicism in Kenya

Sources
 GCatholic.org
 Catholic Hierarchy

Roman Catholic dioceses in Kenya
Christian organizations established in 1926
Roman Catholic dioceses and prelatures established in the 20th century
1926 establishments in Kenya
Roman Catholic Ecclesiastical Province of Nyeri